Borthen is a surname. Notable people with the surname include:

 Leif Borthen (1911–1979), Norwegian journalist and author
 Martin Borthen (1878–1964), Norwegian sailor
 Ingrid Borthen (1913–2001), Norwegian-born Swedish actress